Itmar Esteban Herraiz (born ) is a Spanish male  track cyclist, riding for the national team. He competed in the sprint events at the UCI Track Cycling World Championships between 2007 and 2011.

References

External links
 Profile at cyclingarchives.com

1983 births
Living people
Spanish track cyclists
Spanish male cyclists
Place of birth missing (living people)
Cyclists from Barcelona